The Roman Catholic Diocese of La Vega (erected 25 September 1953) is a suffragan diocese of the Archdiocese of Santiago de los Caballeros.

Bishops

Ordinaries
Francisco Panal Ramírez, O.F.M. (1956 - 1965)
Juan Antonio Flores Santana (1966 - 1992)
Antonio Camilo González (1992 - 2015)
Héctor Rafael Rodríguez Rodríguez, M.S.C. (2015 - )

Other priests of this diocese who became bishops
Nicolás de Jesús López Rodríguez, appointed Bishop of San Francisco de Macorís in 1978; future Cardinal
Fausto Ramón Mejía Vallejo, appointed Bishop of San Francisco de Macorís in 2012
Ramón Benito Ángeles Fernández (priest here, 1978-2002), appointed Auxiliary Bishop of Santo Domingo in 2017

Territorial losses

External links and references

Official website of the Diocese of La Vega

La Vega
La Vega
La Vega
La Vega, Roman Catholic Diocese of
La Vega, Dominican Republic